In mathematics the Mott polynomials sn(x) are polynomials introduced by  who applied them to a problem in the theory of electrons. 
They are given by the exponential generating function 

Because the factor in the exponential has the power series

,
according to the general formula for generalized Appell polynomials,
where the sum is over all compositions  of  into  positive odd integers. The empty product appearing for  equals 1. Special values, where all contributing Catalan numbers equal 1, are

By differentiation the recurrence for the first derivative becomes

The first few of them are  

The polynomials sn(x) form the associated Sheffer sequence for –2t/(1–t2) .
 give an explicit expression for them in terms of the generalized hypergeometric function 3F0:

References

Polynomials